Danish Evangelical Lutheran Church Association in America (often known as the Blair Church) was a Lutheran church body that existed in the United States from 1884 to 1896, when it merged into the United Danish Evangelical Lutheran Church.

History
The Danish Evangelical Lutheran Church Association in America, or simply the Blair Church or the Danish Association, was founded in 1884 when a group of Danish congregations left the Conference of the Norwegian-Danish Evangelical Lutheran Church of America. The Danish Association was founded at a meeting in Argo, Nebraska, and moved to nearby Blair, Nebraska after its founding.

The Danish Association created Trinity Seminary on October 21, 1886 in Blair, Nebraska, with Anton Marius Andersen as the first president.

In 1896, the Danish Association merged with the Danish Evangelical Lutheran Church in North America to form the United Danish Evangelical Lutheran Church.

References

Lutheran denominations in North America
Danish-American history
Evangelical Lutheran Church in America predecessor churches
History of Christianity in the United States
Religious organizations established in 1884
Lutheran denominations established in the 19th century